Prostanthera prostantheroides is a plant in the family Lamiaceae and is endemic to Western Australia. It is a shrub with heart-shaped to round leaves and usually white flowers with purple spots inside the petal tube.

Description
Flowering occurs in August, September or October.

Taxonomy
This species was first formally described in 1876 by Ferdinand von Mueller who gave it the name Wrixonia prostantheroides in his book Fragmenta phytographiae Australiae, based on plant material collected from the vicinity of Mount Churchman by Jess Young. In 2012, Trevor Wilson, Murray Henwood and Barry Conn changed the name to Prostanthera prostantheroides in the journal Telopea.

Distribution
Prostanthera prostantheroides occurs in the Avon Wheatbelt, Coolgardie, Murchison and Yalgoo biogeographic regions of Western Australia.

Conservation status
This mintbush is classified as "not threatened" by the Western Australian Government Department of Parks and Wildlife.

References

prostantheroides
Flora of Western Australia
Taxa named by Ferdinand von Mueller
Plants described in 1876